This is a list of college softball coaches with 1,000 wins as a collegiate head coach. This list includes games won at the NCAA levels. It does not include games won at the junior college level. Coaches with 1,000 wins at the NCAA Division I level are designated with peach shading.

All-time leaders
As of the end of the 2022 NCAA softball season, Carol Hutchins of Michigan is the all-time NCAA wins leader with 1,707 wins.

Patty Gasso of Oklahoma has the highest winning percentage of all active or inactive Division I coaches with at least 1,000 wins, currently at .802.

College softball coaches with 1,000 wins

Key

Coaches
Unless otherwise noted, statistics are correct through the end of the 2022 NCAA softball season..

See also
National Fastpitch Coaches Association Hall of Fame
NCAA Division I Softball Championship

Notes

References

 
Softball
Lists of college softball head coaches in the United States